North Lakeville is a census-designated place (CDP) in the town of Lakeville in Plymouth County, Massachusetts, United States. The population was 2,630 at the 2010 census.

It is roughly bounded by the Middleboro-Lakeville town line to the east, Assawompset Pond to the south, Precinct Street to the southwest, and Rhode Island Road (Route 79) to the north/northwest.

Geography
North Lakeville is located at  (41.865338, -70.944901).

According to the United States Census Bureau, the CDP has a total area of 13.4 km (5.2 mi), of which 13.3 km (5.1 mi) is land and 0.2 km (0.1 mi) (1.16%) is water.

Demographics

As of the census of 2000, there were 2,233 people, 821 households, and 640 families residing in the CDP. The population density was 168.1/km (435.2/mi). There were 861 housing units at an average density of 64.8/km (167.8/mi). The racial makeup of the CDP was 96.37% White, 0.22% African American, 0.18% Native American, 1.07% Asian, 0.04% Pacific Islander, 0.90% from other races, and 1.21% from two or more races. Hispanic or Latino of any race were 1.03% of the population.

There were 821 households, out of which 30.6% had children under the age of 18 living with them, 65.5% were married couples living together, 9.1% had a female householder with no husband present, and 22.0% were non-families. 18.0% of all households were made up of individuals, and 9.5% had someone living alone who was 65 years of age or older. The average household size was 2.72 and the average family size was 3.07.

In the CDP, the population was spread out, with 23.3% under the age of 18, 6.5% from 18 to 24, 29.3% from 25 to 44, 25.8% from 45 to 64, and 15.0% who were 65 years of age or older. The median age was 40 years. For every 100 females, there were 92.8 males. For every 100 females age 18 and over, there were 93.7 males.

The median income for a household in the CDP was $11,176, and the median income for a family was $17,026. Males had a median income of $5,094 versus $3,813 for females. The per capita income for the CDP was $4,906. About 72.2% of families and 84.2% of the population were below the poverty line, including 51.0% of those under age 18 and 71.0% of those age 65 or over.

References

Census-designated places in Plymouth County, Massachusetts
Census-designated places in Massachusetts